Sneaky Pete is an American crime drama series created by David Shore and Bryan Cranston. The series follows Marius Josipović (Giovanni Ribisi), a released convict who adopts the identity of his cellmate, Pete Murphy, to avoid his past life. The series also stars Marin Ireland, Shane McRae, Libe Barer, Michael Drayer, Peter Gerety and Margo Martindale. The pilot debuted on August 7, 2015, and was followed by a full series order that September. Shore left the project in early 2016 and was replaced by Graham Yost, who served as executive producer and showrunner for the remaining nine episodes. The first season premiered in its entirety on January 13, 2017, exclusively on Amazon Prime Video. On January 19, 2017, Amazon announced that Sneaky Pete had been renewed for a second season, which was released on March 9, 2018. On July 28, 2018, Amazon announced that the series had been renewed for a third season, which was released on May 10, 2019.
On June 4, 2019, Amazon cancelled the series after three seasons.

Premise
Sneaky Pete follows Marius, a con man who gets out of prison only to find himself hunted by the vicious gangster he once robbed. With nowhere else to turn, Marius takes cover from his past by assuming the identity of his cellmate, Pete and then "reunites" with Pete's estranged family — who have no reason to suspect he is not their long-lost loved one".

Cast and characters

Main

 Giovanni Ribisi as Marius Josipović / Pete Murphy
 Marin Ireland as Julia Bowman
 Shane McRae as Taylor Bowman
 Libe Barer as Carly Bowman
 Michael Drayer as Eddie Josipović (season 1)
 Peter Gerety as Otto Bernhardt
 Margo Martindale as Audrey Bernhardt
 Jane Adams as Maggie Murphy (season 2, guest season 3)

Recurring

 Ethan Embry as the real Pete Murphy
 Bryan Cranston as Vince Lonigan (season 1)
 Victor Williams as Richard (season 1)
 Karolina Wydra as Karolina (season 1)
 Jacob Pitts as Lance Lord
 Michael O'Keefe as Detective Winslow (season 1)
 Virginia Kull as Katie Boyd (season 1, guest season 2)
 Alison Wright as Marjorie
 Mike Houston as Dennis
 Tobias Segal as Sean
 Brad William Henke as Brendon Boyd (season 1)
 Jeté Laurence as Ellen
 Justine Cotsonas as Shannon
 Kevin Chapman as Bo Lockley
 Jay O. Sanders as Sam
 Chaske Spencer as Chayton Dockery
 René Ifrah as Wali
 Jasmine Carmichael as Gina (seasons 1-2)
 Pej Vahdat as Raj Kumar Mukherjee (season 1)
 Max Darwin as Tate
 Jeffrey De Serrano as Ayawamat
 Malcolm-Jamal Warner as James Bagwell
 C.S. Lee as Joseph Lee (seasons 1-2)
 Ben Vereen as Leon Porter (seasons 1-2)
 Domenick Lombardozzi as Abraham Persikof (season 1)
 Debra Monk as Connie Persikof (season 1)
 Joseph Lyle Taylor as Frank (seasons 1-2)
Michael DeMello as Mikey (season 1) 
 Desmond Harrington as Joe (seasons 1-2)
 David Kallaway as Bako (season 2)
 Jesse Lenat as AJ
 Michael Oberholtzer as Colin (season 2)
 Jennifer Ferrin as Joyce Roby (season 2)
 Miriam Morales as Teacher (season 2)
 John Ales as Luka Delchev (season 2)
 Sara Tomko as Suzanne (season 2)
 Chris Ashworth as Miro (season 2)
 Justine Lupe as Hannah (season 2)
 Efrat Dor as Lizzie DeLaurentis (season 3)
 Jeff Ross as D.C. Doug Decker (season 3)
 Leonardo Nam as Alexandre Park-Sun (season 3)
 Ricky Jay as T. H. Vignetti (season 3). This was Jay's last performance before his death in 2018.
 Darren Pettie as Chuck Johnson (season 3)
 Stephanie Faracy as Dotti  (season 3)
 Charlayne Woodard as Hickey (season 3)
 Amy Landecker as Lorraine Sheffield (season 3)
 M. Emmet Walsh as Tex Hopkins (season 3)
 Patrick J. Adams as Stefan Kilbane (season 3)

Guest
 Rory Culkin as Gavin
 Wayne Duvall as Charles McGregor
 Steve Wiebe as Stephen Davidson

Episodes

Series overview

Season 1 (2015–17)

Season 2 (2018)

Season 3 (2019)

Production

Development

In November 2014, CBS gave a production commitment to Sneaky Pete. A formal pilot for the show was shot in New York in March 2015. On May 8, CBS decided to pass on the pilot, while also canceling David Shore's other series on the network, Battle Creek. Just two days later, it was reported that the pilot might be moving to cable networks, with many expressing interest.

In June, it was reported that Amazon was in negotiations to pick up the pilot, with some tweaking and possible minor reshoots before being made available to the viewers. The pilot was released on Amazon on August 7, 2015 and was ordered to series on September 2, 2015.

In March 2016, it was announced that Shore would be leaving the project, and would be replaced by Graham Yost, who would be taking over as executive producer and showrunner. Start of production of the full series was pushed back to allow for the transition.

Episode 2 and the remainder of the first season premiered on January 13, 2017.

Reception

Critical response
The first season of Sneaky Pete received positive reviews from critics. Rotten Tomatoes gave the first season a 97% 'Certified Fresh' rating, based on 31 critic reviews, with the critical consensus "Suspenseful, smart, and terrifically cast, Sneaky Pete is part dramedy, part crime caper, and all in all entertaining." Metacritic gave the first season a 77 out of 100 score based on 22 critic reviews, indicating "generally favorable reviews".

The second season of Sneaky Pete received positive critical reviews as well. Rotten Tomatoes gave the second season a 92% 'Fresh' rating, based on 12 critic reviews, with the critical consensus "Sneaky Pete'''s sophomore season replicates its predecessor's finesse with narrative sleight of hand and deliciously twisted capers, although Bryan Cranston's gravitas is sorely missed."

The third season of Sneaky Pete'' continued to receive positive critical reviews, with Rotten Tomatoes giving it 100% 'Fresh' rating, based on 5 critic reviews.

Awards and nominations

Margo Martindale was nominated for her performance for Best Supporting Actress in a Drama Series at the 
8th Critics' Choice Television Awards in 2017.

References

External links
 
 

2010s American crime drama television series
2015 American television series debuts
2019 American television series endings
Amazon Prime Video original programming
English-language television shows
Television series by Amazon Studios
Television series by Sony Pictures Television
Television shows set in Connecticut